The 2022 Men's League1 Ontario season was the eighth season of play for League1 Ontario, a Division 3 men's soccer league in the Canadian soccer pyramid and the highest level of soccer based in the Canadian province of Ontario.

Vaughan Azzurri defeated Blue Devils FC in the final to win the league championship and qualified for the 2023 Canadian Championship. Guelph United F.C. represented the league in the 2022 Canadian Championship, as they were the 2021 league champions.

Format and changes
The league returned to a single table format for the 2022 season with each team playing 21 games, following the 2021 season which was shortened due to the COVID-19 pandemic. The regular season ran for 18 weeks between April 21 and August 21 (one postponed match was later played on August 27). The top six teams qualified for the playoffs with the top two getting first round byes. The quarterfinals were held on August 24–25, the semifinals on August 27–28, and the championship final on September 3, which is Labour Day weekend.

With the league set to split into a multi-division format with promotion and relegation beginning in 2024, the points obtained in this season contribute to the assignment of clubs in 2024. The points from the 2022 season (weighted at 75%) will be added to the points teams obtain in the 2023 season (weighted at 100%) to determine the placements.

Clubs
The men's division grew to 22 teams through expansion. Burlington SC, Electric City FC and Simcoe County Rovers joined the league as expansion teams, Pickering FC returned from hiatus and played their first season under their new name, having re-branded after the 2019 season, while Toronto Skillz FC has left the league. Hamilton United, St. Catharines Roma Wolves, and BVB IA Waterloo (formerly Waterloo United) made their official Premier Division debuts, after having opted out of the main division last season, having fielded teams in either the short-season Summer Championship or Reserve divisions instead. 1812 FC Barrie departed the league after playing in the Premier Division last year, as well as Toronto Skillz FC who played in the 2021 L1O Summer Championship and Aurora FC who were on hiatus and joined the Simcoe County Rovers group, also officially departed.

The following clubs participated in the league.

In-season coaching changes

Premier Division

Playoffs

Quarter-finals

Semi-finals

Final

Statistics

Top goalscorers

Updated to end of regular season. Source: League1 Ontario

Top goalkeepers

Updated to end of regular season.  Minimum 900 minutes played. Source:

Awards

League All-Stars
The following players were named League1 Ontario Premier Division All-Stars for the 2022 season:

First Team All-Stars

Second Team All-Stars

Third Team All-Stars

The following players were named League1 Ontario Premier Division U20 All-Stars for the 2022 season:

U20 All-Star Team

U21 Reserve Division
The Reserve Division will return with each Premier Division club fielding one or more teams, as well as some other OPDL clubs that do not operate a League1 Ontario team.

North Division

West Division

Central Division

East Division

Playoffs

U19 Reserve Division
The team in the U19 reserve division played each team in their own division twice, plus some teams from the opposing division once for a 20-game schedule.

Central Division

West Division

Playoffs

References

External links

League1 Ontario
League1 Ontario seasons
Ontario M